Holme on the Wolds is a village in the East Riding of Yorkshire, England.
It lies to west of the B1248 road.

Holme on the Wolds forms part of the civil parish of Dalton Holme. The village forms part of and is run by the Dalton Estate, which is owned by the Hotham family.

Holme on the Wolds was listed as "Hougon" in the Domesday Book. The name is believed to derive from the Old Norse word haugr meaning hills or mound.

In 1823 Holme on the Wolds was a village and civil parish in the Wapentake of Harthill. Population at the time was 138, with occupations including five farmers, a boot & shoe maker, a blacksmith, and a shopkeeper.

References

External links

Villages in the East Riding of Yorkshire